Empire is a 2002 American gangster film starring John Leguizamo and Peter Sarsgaard.

Plot

Victor "Vic" Rosa (Leguizamo) is a drug dealer in New York City who sells a specific brand of heroin called "Empire". His territory is located in the South Bronx, where he and his other rivals, Hector ("Exorcist"), Tito ("Severe"), and Negro ("Dancing Queen") all maintain an uneasy truce because they all purchase their drugs from the same supplier, drug lord Joanna "La Colombiana" Menendez (Isabella Rossellini).

Victor's girlfriend Carmen (Delilah Cotto) invites him to a chic white collar party being thrown by her friend Trish (Denise Richards) and her boyfriend Jack Wimmer (Sarsgaard), an investment banker. He then asks for and is given permission by La Colombiana's younger brother Rafael to assassinate local kingpin Tito (Fat Joe). A shootout occurs, which results in Tito and his young son being killed. With a baby on the way, Vic decides to go straight, and begins to invest money with Jack, receiving significant returns. His friendship with Jack affords Vic a whole new lifestyle, and creates a rift between him and Carmen.

Jack offers Vic an investment opportunity for over 300% return, but there's a catch: the minimum buy-in is $4.5 million, $1.5 million more than Vic has. He approaches La Colombiana with an offer, in which she agrees to lend Vic the money he needs, if he gives her a 500% return and stops a feud between his best friend Jimmy (Vincent Laresca) and rival dealer Hector.

Despite Vic's best efforts, the feud escalates and Jimmy kills Hector.  La Colombiana orders Vic to kill Jimmy, but  instead Vic tells Jimmy to leave town instead. Vic receives his money and gives it to Jack, who disappears the next day.  Victor tracks him down and attempts to reclaim his money, but kills Jack and Trish when they resist.  He escapes with Carmen and her family to Puerto Rico and opens a bar on the south side of the island with what little money he has left.

At the end of the movie, Vic is preparing to head to the hospital to see the birth of his child when Rafael arrives and shoots him in the head. The movie ends with Vic lying dead.

Cast 

John Leguizamo as Victor "Vic" Rosa
Peter Sarsgaard as Jack Wimmer
Denise Richards as Trish
Vincent Laresca as Jimmy
Isabella Rossellini as Joanna "La Colombiana" Menendez
Sônia Braga as Iris
Delilah Cotto as Carmen
Nestor Serrano as Rafael Menendez
Treach as Chedda
Rafael Baez as Jay ("the idiot savant")
Fat Joe as Tito
Carlos Leon as Hector
Granville Adams as Det. Jones
Sam Coppola as Robert Gold
 Rob B. Campbell as Det. O'Brien

Production

Empire started production in September 2000.

Release

Universal Pictures and Arenas Entertainment picked up the film for US$650,000  and released it on December 6, 2002 in 867 theaters.

Reception

Empire received negative reviews. It carries a score of 21% on the review aggregator website Rotten Tomatoes, based on 101 reviews. The website's consensus reads, "In terms of the gangster genre, Empires story is yet another tired retread."

See also
List of American films of 2002
List of hood films

References

External links
 
 

2002 films
2000s English-language films
Films about drugs
Films about organized crime in the United States
Universal Pictures films
Hood films
2000s American films